Hyalornis is a genus of moths in the family Geometridae described by Warren in 1894.

Species
 Hyalornis docta (Schaus & Clemens, 1893)
 Hyalornis livida Herbulot, 1973

References

Ennominae